War and Love is a 1985 American drama film directed by Moshé Mizrahi, written by Abby Mann, and starring Sebastian Keneas, Kyra Sedgwick, David Spielberg, Cheryl Gianini, Eda Reiss Merin and Brita Youngblood. It was released on September 13, 1985, by The Cannon Group, Inc.

Plot

Cast       
Sebastian Keneas as Jacek
Kyra Sedgwick as Halina
David Spielberg as Aron
Cheryl Gianini as Zlatka
Eda Reiss Merin as Masha
Brita Youngblood as Hela
Reuel Schiller as Lutek
Eric Faber as Yankele
Stephen Mailer as Sevek
Matthew Bonfiglio as Rudy
Liliana Komorowska as Esther
Dennis Boutsikaris as Marek
Shmuel Wolf as Warszawski
Lee Wallace as Oskar Kohn
Alan Feinstein as Franek
Gerald Hiken as Reb Shulem
Paul Zim as Cantor
Larry Atlas as Sarge
Evan Handler as Elie
Leopold Kozlowski as Band Leader
Gołda Tencer as Singer / Mother

References

External links
 
 

1985 films
American drama films
1985 drama films
Films directed by Moshé Mizrahi
Films set in the 1940s
Holocaust films
Films set in Warsaw
1980s English-language films
1980s American films